Moshe Koyfman is an American businessperson and investor.

Biography 

Koyfman is a native of New Jersey. He attended the University of Pennsylvania. He holds a B.S. in economics with a concentration in finance and a B.A. in English.

Career 
After graduating from college, Koyfman joined Bear Stearns as an investment banker, where he worked on mergers and acquisitions and raising financing for media, technology and entertainment companies.

He next joined IAC, an internet holding company as vice president of mergers and acquisitions and vice president of programming, helping to launch a new business unit focused on digital media. He led the IAC acquisition of Connected Ventures, the parent of Vimeo, CollegeHumor and BustedTees. He eventually served as the chief operating officer of Connected Ventures.

Venture investing

He was hired by Spark Capital, a Boston venture capital fund in the summer of 2008. His work was focused on expanding into the New York media and entertainment sectors.

Among the first investments led by Koyfman at Spark were stakes in online marketplaces Skillshare and WorkMarket. Later investments include eyeglass retailer Warby Parker, fraud prevention software company Sift Science, financial service provider Plaid (company), Kitchensurfing, Aviary, DIY, FundersClub, Consumer United, gdgt, and Svpply. Koyfman's exits for Spark include eBay buying Svvply, AOL buying gdgt, and Adobe Systems buying Aviary. He became a member of the Board of directors for Skillshare, WorkMarket, Aviary, Plaid, DIY and Consumers United.

Koyfman was promoted in 2012 to General Partner, one of six at Spark, at the age of 35.

In 2012, Koyfman was named one of New York's top 100 angel investors by Business Insider.

He left Spark in 2016  and founded MOKO BRANDS, an investment company focused on consumer brands.

In 2019, he launched Shine Capital, a new venture-capital firm, with business partner Josh Mohrer. An SEC filing on 11 November 2020 listed Shine Capital as having a gross asset value of $59,615,000.

Personal 

Koyfman is married to Hillary Rosenman Koyfman, a designer.

Philanthropic activities

He has been on the board of directors of ArtWorks, a non-profit that offers art therapy to hospitalized children.

He also served as a member of the Whitney Museum of American Art Future Leadership Council,  Solomon R. Guggenheim Museum Collections Council, and the New York Public Library Tech Advisory Group.

In 2013, Koyfman became an early backer and member of the board of directors of Sefaria, a non-profit online open source free content library of Hebrew and English Jewish texts.

References 

Venture capitalists
Angel investors
Living people
People from New Jersey
University of Pennsylvania alumni
Year of birth missing (living people)